Lavanya Rajamani (born 1973) is an Indian lawyer, author and professor whose area of expertise is international climate change law, environmental law, and policy. She is currently a professor of International Environmental Law at the Faculty of Law, University of Oxford, a Yamani Fellow in Public International Law at St Peter's College, Oxford, and a visiting professor at the Centre for Policy Research.

She was the first Rhodes Scholar of National Law School of India University and is the youngest Indian academic to be invited to offer a course in public international law at the Hague Academy of International Law in the Netherlands.

Background and education 
Lavanya Rajamani grew up in south India. She holds a Bachelor of Law (LLB) degree from the National Law School of India University in 1996 and a Bachelor of Civil Law (BCL) from the University of Oxford in 1997, where she was a Rhodes scholar. In 1998 she completed her Master of Laws (LLM) from Yale University where her supervisor was Professor Daniel Esty. She then went on the complete her Doctor of Philosophy (D.Phil.) from the University of Oxford in 2002, where her supervisor was Professor Marcel Brus, and Doctor of Philosophy (Ph.D.) (By Incorporation Ad eundem degree) from the University of Cambridge in 2006.

Career 
Lavanya Rajamani has worked on and analysed the international climate negotiations since 1998. Among other roles, she has served as a legal consultant to United Nations Framework Convention on Climate Change (UNFCCC) secretariat, as a negotiator for the Alliance of Small Island States, and as a legal adviser to the Chairs of Ad Hoc Working Groups under the UNFCCC. She was also part of the UNFCCC core drafting and advisory team for the 2015 Paris Agreement. Rajamani has advised government and multilateral agencies, including the Danish Ministry of Climate Change, the UNDP, the World Bank, and the Indian Ministry of Environment and Forests.

She was previously a professor at the Centre for Policy Research in New Delhi. She has been a lecturer of Environmental Law, and a Fellow and Director of Studies in Law, at Queens’ College, Cambridge, and a Junior Research Fellow in Public International Law at Worcester College, Oxford. She has also taught public international law, international climate change law, international environmental law, and human rights law at the Hague Academy of International Law, Ashoka University, Osaka Gakuin University, Aix-Marseille University, and University of Bologna.

Rajamani serves as Coordinating Lead Author for the Intergovernmental Panel on Climate Change's Sixth Assessment Report. She is a member of the influential Climate Crisis Advisory Group (CCAG), led by Sir David King, and a principal co-investigator on the inter-disciplinary Oxford University initiative, Oxford Net Zero.

She is also frequent contributor to national Indian dailies such as The Indian Express and Livemint, where she provides expertise on India's engagement with the global climate negotiations.

Research 
Her latest co-edited book, the second edition of the Oxford Handbook of International Environmental Law (Oxford University Press, 2021), with over 67 chapters and 70 contributors, spans 1232 pages.  Her course at the Hague Academy of International Law on 'Innovation and Experimentation in the International Climate Change Regime,' was published as part of the Collected Courses of the Hague Academy of International Law/ Receuil des Cours in 2020. Her co-authored book, International Climate Change Law (Oxford University Press, 2017), was awarded an American Society of International Law Book Prize.

Rajamani has published various articles in prestigious peer-reviewed international journals such International & Comparative Law Quarterly, International Affairs, European Journal of International Law, Climate Policy, Cambridge Journal of International Law and Theoretical Inquiries in Law.

Her lecture on the ‘International Climate Change Regime: Evolution and Challenges’ features in the UN Audio Visual Library of International Law.

Author 

 Innovation and Experimentation in the International Climate Change Regime. Collected Courses of the Hague Academy of International Law/ Recueil des Cours, Brill, 2020.
Differential Treatment in International Environmental Law. Oxford University Press, 2006.

Co-author 

 International Climate Change Law. Oxford University Press, 2017. Daniel Bodansky, Jutta Brunnée and Lavanya Rajamani. (Winner of the ASIL 2018 Certificate of Merit for a specialized area of international law)
Implementation of International Environmental Law. Hague Academy of International Law, 2011. By Sandrine Maljean Dubois and Lavanya Rajamani

Editor 

 The Oxford Handbook of International Environmental Law (2nd edition). Oxford University Press, 2021. Edited by Lavanya Rajamani and Jacqueline Peel.
Promoting Compliance in An Evolving Climate Regime. Cambridge University Press, 2012. Edited by Jutta Brunnee, Meinhard Doelle and Lavanya Rajamani
 Climate Change Liability: Transnational Law and Practice. Cambridge University Press, 2012 Edited by Richard Lord, Silke Goldberg, Lavanya Rajamani and Jutta Brunnee

References

Further reading 

 

Living people
Alumni of the University of Cambridge
Fellows of Queens' College, Cambridge
Yale University alumni
21st-century Indian lawyers
21st-century Indian women lawyers
Indian Rhodes Scholars
Academics of the University of Oxford
Indian environmental lawyers
1973 births
Alumni of Hertford College, Oxford